Mangala Suresh Angadi is an Indian politician and a Member of Parliament from Belagavi parliamentary constituency of Karnataka state. She is the first Woman Member of Parliament from Belagavi.

Personal life

She is the wife of Late Suresh Angadi, former Minister of State of Railways. She has two daughters.

Political career

She successfully contested the 2021 by poll from Belagavi Lok sabha seat from the Bharatiya Janata Party, after the demise of Suresh Angadi.

She won against the Karnataka Pradesh Congress Committee working president, Satish Jarkiholi by 5,240 votes. She is the first politician to defeat Satish Jarkiholi. He had never lost an election in his political life of about 30 years.

References

Bharatiya Janata Party politicians from Karnataka
People from Belgaum
Kannada people
Lok Sabha members from Karnataka
India MPs 2019–present
1963 births
Living people